Milan Damnjanović (1924–1994) (Serbian Cyrillic Милан Дамњановић) was a Serbian philosopher, full professor at the Faculty of Fine Arts of Belgrade University. 

Milan Damnjanović was the founder and the president of the Aesthetic Society of Serbia (1980-1994), vice president of the International Aesthetics Society, a member of the International Committee of Greek Humanistic Society for Philosophy in Athens, a member of the presiding committee of the International Society for Dialectic Philosophy (Societas Hegeliana), a member of the American Aesthetics Society.

Works
Aesthetics and Disappointment (1970)
An outline of a Philosophy of Poetry (1971); 
The Essence and the History (1976);
'La Sens de la Morale Esthétique', Revue d'esthétique 3 (1980). In French.
Creating and Understanding Technological Art, Proceedings of the IXth International Congress of Aesthetics, (editor) (1983)
Rationality Against Rationalism (1984)
Tendencies in modern aesthetics (1984)
Phenomenon Film (1985)
Dealing With Multiplicity (1990)

Further reading
At the Aesthetics Department of Philosophy Faculty in M.V. Lomonosov Moscow State University, Jevgenija Viktorovha Aljehina defended the doctoral thesis Aesthetics Views of Milan Damjanović in 1983 — while the University of Arts in Belgrade and Aesthetics Society of Serbia dedicated the book Towards Philosophy of Arts to a philosopher and an aesthetist of a worldwide reputation Milan Damjanović. This Memorial, prepared by Branislava Milijić and published in 1996, consists of articles from 15 foreign authors and 27 authors from Yugoslavia.

See also  
 Simo Elaković

1924 births
1994 deaths
20th-century Serbian philosophers
Academic staff of the University of Belgrade